The 1959 Torneo Godó was the seventh edition of the Torneo Godó annual tennis tournament played on clay courts in Barcelona, Spain and it took place from 1–7 June 1959. Neale Fraser won the singles title.

Seeds

Champions

Men's singles
 Neale Fraser defeated  Roy Emerson 6–2, 6–4, 3–6, 6–3

Men's doubles
 Roy Emerson /  Neale Fraser defeated  Luis Ayala /  Rod Laver 6–2, 4–6, 6–3, 13–11

Draw

Finals

References

External links
 ITF – Tournament details
 Official tournament website
 ATP tournament profile

Barcelona Open (tennis)
Godo
Spain